is the pen name of Maki Satoh, a Japanese manga artist.

Career 
She made her debut as a professional manga artist with three yaoi collections after being scouted in art school. She was a student of Rachel Thorn, who provided translations for some of the English licenses of her work. Her work has been praised as having unusual maturity and depth, both for yaoi and for manga in general. She is currently working on non-yaoi manga.

Two of her first manga have been released in English by Aurora Publishing, which is a direct subsidiary of the Japanese publishing company Ohzora Shuppan, the original publishers of one of the works in question. A third has been licensed by Net Comics. In addition, her work Tableau Numbero 20, has been released by the Viz Media imprint Sublime.

Bibliography
 , 2006, published by Tokyou Mangasha
Licensed in English as Seduce Me After the Show by Deux Press and subsequently by Digital Manga (Digital Manga Guild)
Tableau No. 20, 2007–2009, published by Be x Boy Gold
 , 2008, published by Tokyou Mangasha
Licensed in English as Age Called Blue by Net Comics
 , 2008, published by Ohzora Shuppan
Licensed in English as Red Blinds the Foolish by Deux Press
 , 2008, published by Tokyo Mangasha 
Licensed in English by Digital Manga (Digital Manga Guild)
 , 2008, published by Tokyo Mangasha 
Licensed in English by Digital Manga (Digital Manga Guild)
 , 2010–2011, published by Kurofune Zero
 Equus, 2010–2011
 , 2011–2014, published by Shogakukan
Ii ne! Hikaru Genji-kun (いいね!光源氏くん), 2015–2021, published by Shodensha in Feel Young

References

Living people
Year of birth missing (living people)
Women manga artists
Pseudonymous artists
21st-century pseudonymous writers
Pseudonymous women writers
21st-century Japanese women artists
Manga artists from Tokyo